Barsha Raut is a Nepalese actress known for her works in Nepali cinema. She has worked in critically acclaimed films like Jatra and Gopi, as well as commercially hit films like Chhakka Panja, Chhakka Panja 2, and Jatrai Jatra.

Life and career
Barsha Raut has appeared in numerous music videos, television commercials and Nepali feature films. She started her career as a model with the music video ‘Rojeko Maile’  in 2013. She then featured in several music videos before making it onto the silver screen. She made her acting debut with Nai Nabhannu La 4  opposite Paul Shah and Aanchal Sharma who were also debutantes. The film was a blockbuster at the box office. Her most notable works to date as an actress include hits like Chhakka Panja, Jatra and its sequel Jatrai Jatra, Chhakka Panja 2, Chhakka Panja 3, Mr. Jholay and Gopi,. She has been acclaimed for her acting and character in the movie Jatra and has bagged awards from her other movies.

Raut married Sanjog Koirala on February 14, 2019.

Filmography

References

External links
 
 

Living people
21st-century Nepalese actresses
Nepalese female models
Nepalese film actresses
21st-century Nepalese dancers
1993 births